Jakob Stutz (1801–1877) was a Swiss writer.

Selected works 
 Gemälde aus dem Volksleben, nach der Natur aufgenommen und getreu dargestellt in gereimten Gesprächen Zürcherischer Mundart. Sechs Bände. Schulthess, Zürich 1831–53
 Briefe und Lieder aus dem Volksleben. St. Gallen 1839
 Vaterländische Schauspiele zur Feier von Volks- und Jugendfesten für Kinder und Erwachsene im Freien aufzuführen. Vom Verfasser der Volks-Gemälde. St. Gallen 1842
 Liese und Salome, die beiden Webermädchen. Eine Erzählung aus dem Volksleben. Meyer und Zeller, Zürich 1847
 Der arme Jakob und die reiche Anna oder „Was Gott zusammengefügt hat, das soll der Mensch nicht scheiden“. Erzählung aus dem Volksleben. J.H. Locher, Zürich (um 1848)
 Sieben mal sieben Jahre aus meinem Leben. Als Beitrag zu näherer Kenntnis des Volkes. Fünf Bände. Zwingli, Pfäffikon 1853–55
 letzte Neuausgabe: Huber, Frauenfeld 1983; 2. (um ein Vorwort ergänzte) A. 2001
 Der verirrte Sohn oder Die Räuber auf dem Schwarzwald. Schauspiel in vier Aufzügen. Glarus 1861
 Wie Stiefkinder ihrer bösen Stiefmutter los werden. Nach einer wahren Begebenheit. Lustspiel in vier Aufzügen in Zürcher Mundart. Glarus 1865

Bibliography 
 Otto Schaufelberger: Endlich geht die Sonne auf. Wunderliche, fröhliche und traurige Jugenderlebnisse des Volksdichters Jakob Stutz nach seiner Selbstbiographie „Sieben mal sieben Jahre aus meinem Leben“. Orell Füssli, Zürich 1962
 Jakob Zollinger: Auf den Spuren von Jakob Stutz. Wetzikon 1977
 Ursula Brunold-Bigler: Jakob Stutz’ Autobiographie „Sieben mal sieben Jahre aus meinem Leben“ als Quelle populärer Lesestoffe im 19. Jahrhundert, in: Schweizerisches Archiv für Volkskunde, 75. Jg. (1979), S. 28–42
 Jakob Stutz (1801–1877). Zürcher Oberländer Volksdichter und Zeitzeuge. Beiträge und Würdigungen, hg. von der Antiquarischen Gesellschaft Pfäffikon. Wetzikon 2001

References

External links 
 
 Eintrag im Autoren-Verzeichnis der Stiftung Bibliomedia
 Geschichte der Gemeinde Hittnau (mit Abschnitt zu Jakob Stutz)
 Informationen zum Jakob Stutz Wander- und Bike-Weg von Pfäffikon nach Sternenberg mit Lebensstationen des Dichters (PDF; 472 kB)
 Nachlass in der Zentralbibliothek Zürich

1801 births
1877 deaths
Folklorists
German-language writers
Swiss writers